Aneilema silvaticum is a species of plant in the family Commelinaceae. It is found in Cameroon, the Democratic Republic of the Congo, and Nigeria. Its natural habitat is subtropical or tropical moist lowland forests. It is threatened by habitat loss.

References

silvaticum
Vulnerable plants
Flora of West Tropical Africa
Plants described in 1952
Taxonomy articles created by Polbot